Polyploca ridens, the frosted green, is a moth of the family Drepanidae. It is found in southern and central Europe, England, Denmark, southern Sweden and in the east up to Russia.

The wingspan is 30–35 mm. The moth flies from April to May depending on the location.

The larvae feed on oaks.

Subspecies
Polyploca ridens ridens
Polyploca ridens transmarina (Rungs, 1972) (Morocco)

References

External links

Moths and Butterflies of Europe and North Africa
Fauna Europaea
Lepiforum.de

Moths described in 1787
Thyatirinae
Drepanid moths of Great Britain
Moths of Europe
Taxa named by Johan Christian Fabricius